Mohamed Amir (born 27 November 1969) is a Maldivian sprinter. He competed in the 400 metres at the 1992 Summer Olympics and the 1996 Summer Olympics.

References

External links
 

1969 births
Living people
Athletes (track and field) at the 1992 Summer Olympics
Athletes (track and field) at the 1996 Summer Olympics
Maldivian male sprinters
Olympic athletes of the Maldives
Place of birth missing (living people)